Boleszyn refers to the following places in Poland:

 Boleszyn, Świętokrzyskie Voivodeship
 Boleszyn, Warmian-Masurian Voivodeship